Pingshan Center station is a station on Line 14 of Shenzhen Metro in Shenzhen, Guangdong, China, which is opened on 28 October 2022. It is located in Pingshan District.

The station is in central Pingshan District, Shenzhen. It is near the Pingshan District Government, Pingshan District Central Park (坪山区中心公园), and Pingshan District Experimental School (坪山区实验学校).

It is near the station of the same name on the under construction , and is expected to be used for transferring to and from the SkyShuttle.

History
In March 2018, Shenzhen Metro Group Co., Ltd. released the Environmental Impact Report of Shenzhen Urban Rail Transit Line 14 Project, which includes this station. The construction name is Zhuyangkeng station.

On April 22, 2022, Shenzhen Municipal Bureau of Planning and Natural Resources issued the Announcement on the Approval Scheme of Shenzhen Rail Transit Phase IV Station Name Plan, in which the station name change to Pingshan Center station. The reason is that the station is located in the central area of Pingshan District.

On October 28, 2022, the station was opened together with Shenzhen Metro Line 14.

Station layout

Exits
Pingshan Center station has four exits, of which Exit A and C are equipped with elevators and Exit C is equipped with toilets.

References

External links
 Shenzhen Metro Pingshan Center Station (Chinese)
 Shenzhen Metro Pingshan Center Station (English)

Railway stations in Guangdong
Shenzhen Metro stations
Railway stations in China opened in 2022